Alne may refer to one of the following locations;

Alne, North Yorkshire, England
River Alne, Warwickshire, England
Great Alne, Warwickshire
Little Alne, Warwickshire

See also
William Alne, MP